National City may refer to:

Places in the United States of America
National City, California
National City, Illinois
National City, Michigan
Bristol Wells Town Site (National City, Nevada), a ghost town now known as Bristol Wells

Banks
National City Corp., a bank formerly headquartered in Cleveland, Ohio
National City acquisition by PNC
National City Bank of New York, the precursor of Citibank

Companies
National City Lines,  a holding company for streetcar and bus lines in the United States

Fiction
National City (DC Comics), a fictional city in DC Comics which is the home of Supergirl in both the comics and TV series of the same name

See also
Capital city